Wilhelmenia Fernandez, sometimes billed as Wilhelmenia Wiggins Fernandez, is an American soprano.

She was born in Philadelphia in 1949. She appeared in the 1981 film Diva by French director Jean-Jacques Beineix.

Fernandez's early training was at the Philadelphia Academy of Vocal Arts, followed by a scholarship at the Juilliard School of Music in New York City. Her operatic debut was as Bess in Porgy and Bess, for Houston Grand Opera, a production which toured both the U.S. and Europe.

She made her début in Paris as Musetta in La bohème (with Plácido Domingo and Dame Kiri Te Kanawa), and at the New York City Opera in the same role in 1982.

Since then she has sung in operas and recitals in cities all over the world. Her more notable roles have been the title roles in Carmen, Carmen Jones (for which she received the Laurence Olivier Theatre Award in 1992 as Best Actress in a Musical), and Aïda (a role she has performed in Luxor and at the Egyptian pyramids).

She has made recordings of George Gershwin songs and of Negro spirituals.

She has not appeared in a feature film since Diva, according to the IMDb database, though she performed on the soundtrack of Someone to Watch Over Me and as herself on television.

References

External links
 

1949 births
Musicians from Philadelphia
American operatic sopranos
Living people
Laurence Olivier Award winners
African-American_women_opera_singers